The Croatian Heritage Foundation is an organization which works with Croatian emigrants. It helps connect diaspora groups back to the country. The foundation organizes several programs within Croatia and around the world ranging from language to folklore. It publishes its own monthly magazine, Matica, as well as the Croatian Emigrant Almanac, printed in Croatian, English and Spanish.

A large part of the foundation's work deals with preventing the assimilation of diaspora Croats into other cultures. This is significant because of the relatively large population of Croats living outside of the country. The CHF runs branches in Pula, Rijeka, Zadar, Split, Dubrovnik and Vukovar.

Its  director is Mijo Matić.

References

External links
  

Croatian-American history
Croatian diaspora organizations
Croatian culture
Croatian Heritage Foundation
1951 establishments in Croatia